Batu kenongs, also known as stone kenongs, is a type of megalith. They became prevalent sometime between the neolithic and early Iron Ages as megalithic culture spread to Indonesia. Archeological research of the stones began in the late 19th century, continuing to present day. There is much uncertainty in how they came to Indonesia, but they are believed to have been used to support buildings.

Definition
Betu kenongs are upright cylindrical or rounded stones and receive their name from their physical resemblance to the gamelan music instrument, the kenong. They are described as "cylindrical stones with a knob on top", and  classified into three separate categories: those with a single cylindrical knob, those with two cylindrical knobs, and those with rounded knobs. Excavations have revealed them in patterns of rectangles and circles, which has led archeologists to believe they were used for foundations of structures. Along with their organization, the archeological excavation done by Willems (1938) has continued to support this theory. The excavation found two different purposes for Kenong stones, each used in conjunction to create a foundation.  Kenong stones surrounding structures were used to support bamboo stilts in which a bamboo pole would be placed onto the knobs of the stone. Adversely, stones in the center of the construction were used to carry the majority of the house's weight. The stones in the center were supported by a large stone tab, thus the weight was deferred onto it from the kenong stones creating a steady foundation. This, along with the arrangement of stones in a circular or rectangular pattern, helps to solidify their use as building implements.

History
Megaliths can be seen all over Indonesia, spreading from the East to the West. However, even with such a large distribution historians have yet to be able to exactly pinpoint a time and reason for the introduction of megaliths into the region. Theories suggest the culture started in Asia, Ancient Egypt, or along the Mediterranean. Overall, most contribute the appearance of megaliths to cultural diffusion sometime between the neolithic and early Iron Ages.

Bondowoso, located in the Java region, has attracted much archeological attention for its extensive number of megaliths. 1898 marked the first documentation of the artifacts in the area and led to the kenong stone, along with three other megaliths, first being classified for its distinct characteristics. More excavation and research into the early 1940s generated interest in megaliths in Indonesia, leading to a new wave of investigation by the National Research Centre of Archeology after World War 2. This new research discovered 47 megalithic sites in Bondowoso, 13 of them containing Batu kenongs.

Notes

References

Megalithic monuments
Archaeological sites in Indonesia